The Tasmanian One Design is a class of Australian sail boat.

Origin

In February 1900, The Rudder magazine published plans, by William Hand Jr, of a "knockabout".  E H Webster, a prominent member of the Derwent Sailing Boat Club (later to become the Royal Yacht Club of Tasmania (RYCT)), was looking for a yacht to be used as a One-Design class for the club. The yacht Elf was built using (loosely) Hand's design.  A few more yachts were built to variations of the design, including Caprice and Erica (built by Logan Bros in Auckland), but a one-design class was not formed.

Webster had Hand's design modified, by Hobart naval architect Alf Blore, to suit local sailing conditions and boat building practice and by 1911 had persuaded several yachtsman to build identical yachts. These yachts, built for the sum of about £200, became known simply as "One-Designers".

A total of 7 One-Designers were built in Tasmania. They are listed below, by sail number:

 Weene - Built 1910 by Charles Lucas for E H Webster
 Pandora - Built 1910 by Charles Lucas for D Barclay Jr
 Curlew - Built 1911 by Charles Lucas for Douglas, Tarleton and Knight
 Vanity  - Built 1911 by Charles Lucas for W Darling, Dr Ireland and Stanley Crisp
 Pilgrim - Built by E A Jack of Launceston for Richmond Tinning
 Canobie - Built 1912 by Charles Lucas
   "Gannet"   - Built 1911 by Charles Lucas 

Two One-Designers were built in New Zealand.  These were known in New Zealand as Tasmanian One-Designers.  The first, Pacific, was built by T Le Huquet in 1914 for Frank Rule, a Tasmanian. It was hoped that more would be built but the World War I put a stop to that. Pacific was wrecked in a gale in February 1918.  In 1922, Vanitiewas built by Joe Slattery for the Morris brothers.  She had a very successful racing career and won the Tauranga Gold Cup for the Auckland-Tauranga race in 1925.  At some stage in the 1960s she was burnt out but was repaired with untreated timber. By 1983 the dry-rot was so extensive she was stripped of her fittings and cut up.

Varuna was built in Bombay, India some time prior to 1916.

The One-Designers went on to dominate racing on the River Derwent until the 1920s. Eventually outclassed by the later and larger "A-Class" yachts in the 1920s and 1930s, and too large for the "B-Class", Vanity and Weene were simply cut in half and lengthened to once again lead the fleet. Pandora had her foredeck raised and Curlew had her topsides raised by two planks. Canobie and Gannet have hulls in more or less original condition, with Canobie reverting to gaff rig in recent years.

Original specifications

References

Sailing yachts
1900s sailboat type designs